Koźmin may refer to the following places in Poland:

Koźmin, Lower Silesian Voivodeship (south-west Poland)
Koźmin, Szamotuły County in Greater Poland Voivodeship (west-central Poland)
Koźmin, Turek County in Greater Poland Voivodeship (west-central Poland)
Koźmin, Pomeranian Voivodeship (north Poland)
 Koźmin Wielkopolski was known as Koźmin until 1996